Osvaldo Rivera Cianchini ( – December 27, 2020) was a Puerto Rican Judge and the founder of the San Blas half Marathon and the Comité de Fondismo de la Federación de Atletismo de Puerto Rico (FAPR), the Asociación de Turistas Olímpicos de Puerto Rico and Fraternidad Delta Phi Delta.

On January 19, 2013, he was honored with the Manuel Luciano prize given by the Asociación de Escritores de Historia Deportiva. He was a member of Phi Sigma Alpha fraternity.

He was inducted to the Pabellón de la Fama del Fondismo Puertorriqueño in 1999, and to the Pabellón de la Fama del Deporte de Coamo in 2015. He died from COVID-19 at Ashford Hospital in San Juan on December 27, 2020, at age 80.

References

1940 births
2020 deaths
Deaths from the COVID-19 pandemic in Puerto Rico
People from Coamo, Puerto Rico
Puerto Rican judges